Theodrenaline (INN), also known as noradrenalinoethyltheophylline, is a chemical linkage of norepinephrine (noradrenaline) and theophylline used as a cardiac stimulant.

It is sometimes combined with cafedrine.

See also 
 Cafedrine
 Fenethylline

References 

Adenosine receptor antagonists
Catecholamines
Cardiac stimulants
Phenylethanolamines
Xanthines